Programme of Action for Cancer Therapy (PACT) is a programme created by the International Atomic Energy Agency (IAEA) in 2004 to build upon the Agency’s experience in radiation medicine and technology, and enable developing countries to introduce, expand or improve their cancer care capacity and services in a sustainable manner by integrating radiotherapy into a comprehensive cancer control programme that maximizes its therapeutic effectiveness and impact. Such a programme integrates and aligns cancer prevention, surveillance, screening and early detection, treatment and palliative care activities and investments, and is set up based on the Guidelines of the World Health Organization (WHO). It also addresses other challenges such as infrastructure gaps and, through partnerships, builds capacity and long term support for continuous education and training of cancer care professionals, as well as for community-based civil society action to combat cancer.

PACT has its headquarters in Vienna, Austria.

PACT and its partners are developing multidisciplinary cancer capacity building projects called PACT Model Demonstration Sites (PMDS).  As of 2010, there are eight PMDS: Albania, Ghana, Mongolia, Nicaragua, Sri Lanka,  United Republic of Tanzania, Vietnam and the Republic of Yemen.

See also
 Cancer
 International Atomic Energy Agency (IAEA)
 Oncology
 Radiation therapy

References

External links
 PACT Official Site
 International Atomic Energy Agency Official Site

Cancer organizations
International medical and health organizations
International Atomic Energy Agency
International organisations based in Austria